Brigitte María Merlano Pájaro (born 29 April 1982 in Barranquilla) is a Colombian hurdler.  Her first name is also spelled Briggite or Brigith.  At the 2012 Summer Olympics, she competed in the Women's 100 metres hurdles.

Personal bests
100 m: 12.12 (wind: -0.1 m/s) –  Caguas, 15 March 2012
200 m: 24.08 (wind: -2.5 m/s) –  Ponce, 12 Apr 2008
100 m hurdles: 12.89 (wind: +0.9 m/s) –  Mayagüez, 17 July 2011

Competition record

References

External links

Colombian female hurdlers
1982 births
Living people
Olympic athletes of Colombia
Athletes (track and field) at the 2012 Summer Olympics
Athletes (track and field) at the 2007 Pan American Games
Athletes (track and field) at the 2011 Pan American Games
Athletes (track and field) at the 2015 Pan American Games
Athletes (track and field) at the 2016 Summer Olympics
Pan American Games competitors for Colombia
Sportspeople from Barranquilla
Athletes (track and field) at the 2018 South American Games
South American Games bronze medalists for Colombia
South American Games medalists in athletics
Central American and Caribbean Games medalists in athletics
21st-century Colombian women